Kristopher Elián Quesada-Thorn (born 19 February 2005) is a footballer who plays as a defender for the youth academy of Arsenal. Born in England, he is a Costa Rica youth international.

Club career
As a youth player, Quesada joined the youth academy of English Premier League side Arsenal.

International career
Quesada is eligible to represent Sweden and the Republic of Ireland through his grandparents.

References

External links
 

2005 births
Living people
English people of Irish descent
English people of Swedish descent
Costa Rican footballers
English footballers
Association football defenders
Costa Rica youth international footballers
Arsenal F.C. players